Hymenodora is a genus of shrimp, containing four species, which collectively have a southern circumpolar distribution.
Hymenodora acanthitelsonis Wasmer, 1972
Hymenodora frontalis Rathbun, 1902
Hymenodora glacialis (Buchholz, 1874)
Hymenodora gracilis Smith, 1886

References

Caridea